USS Sumter was a 525-ton sidewheel paddle steamer captured by the Union Navy during the Union blockade of the American Civil War.

Sumter originally was the Confederate cottonclad ram CSS General Sumter. She was placed into Confederate service and then United States Navy service, each for a short period of time, before she ran aground and was destroyed.

Acquired by the Confederacy in 1861 

Sumter was a sidewheel steamer. She operated on the Mississippi River and its tributaries as a towboat until early 1861, when she was purchased by the State of Louisiana from Charles H. Morgan′s Southern Steamship Company.

In January 1862, Confederate States Navy Captain James E. Montgomery for the Confederate States War Department's River Defense Fleet. The steamer was refitted at Algiers as a cottonclad ram by the James Martin yard. Her bow was strengthened by 4-inch (10.2-cm) oak sheathing covered by 1-inch (2.54-cm) iron plates. In addition, cotton bales were compressed between double pine bulkheads for added strength.

Confederate service 

Renamed General Sumter, the ram proceeded to Fort Pillow, Tennessee, on 17 April 1862 to be armed.

On 10 May 1862, defending the main avenue to Memphis, Tennessee, Montgomery′s fleet of eight vessels attacked a force of Union  ironclads. In the resulting Battle of Plum Point Bend, 4 miles (6.4 km) above Fort Pillow, General Sumter, with Raphael Semmes in command, steamed within 20 yards (18.3 meters) of the Union Navy Mortar Boat No. 16, whose projectiles were threatening the fort, and fired everything she had, including a rifle volley; two 32-pound (14.5-kg) shot pierced the iron blinds of the Union mortar boat.

Then the sidewheel steamer CSS General Sterling Price and General Sumter cooperated in a well-executed coordinated attack, one after the other, ramming the casemate gunboat  at full speed so that she lost her rudder and much of her stern; Cincinnati (which Montgomery reported as the ironclad gunboat ) had to be run ashore to avoid sinking. Next, General Sumter rammed and damaged the gunboat , but was damaged by gunfire herself. Thus, the Confederate rams held off the Union flotilla until the fort was successfully evacuated on 1 June 1862. They then retired to Memphis to refuel.

Quickly following up the capture of Fort Pillow, U.S. Navy Flag Officer Charles H. Davis appeared off Memphis in force on 6 June 1862. Montgomery, cornered without enough coal to retreat to Vicksburg, Mississippi, yet unwilling to scuttle his fleet, fought it out desperately in the Battle of Memphis. General Sumter rammed and seriously damaged the sidewheel paddle steamer , but eventually most of the Confederate vessels were destroyed or surrendered. General Sumter did not sink; badly shot up, she ran on the Arkansas shore, was captured, refloated, and renamed Sumter by the Union Navy.

Union service

While in Union service, she grounded again on 14–15 August 1862 downriver from Memphis off Bayou Sara, Louisiana, and was abandoned except for spare-part raids on her machinery by the rest of the squadron at periods of low water. Before the local populace completed stripping her, Confederate authorities succeeded in setting fire to the hulk, destroying her.

See also

Confederate States Navy
Union Navy
Ships captured in the American Civil War
Bibliography of American Civil War naval history
Anaconda Plan
Mississippi Squadron
List of United States Navy ships
 Battle of Fort Pillow

References 

Ships of the Union Navy
Ships built in New Orleans
Steamships of the United States Navy
Rams of the United States Navy
Captured ships
1853 ships
Shipwrecks of the American Civil War
Shipwrecks of the Mississippi River
Shipwrecks in rivers
Maritime incidents in June 1862
Maritime incidents in August 1862